Benjamin Frank Shelton (January 1, 1902 – February 28, 1963) was an American singer and banjoist who recorded a number of songs for Victor Records at the Bristol sessions in Bristol, Tennessee on July 29, 1927. Shelton traveled from Corbin, Kentucky where he worked as a barber to Bristol for the sessions with gospel singer and preacher Alfred Karnes. Four of the recordings survive today, "Darling Cora", "Pretty Polly", "Oh Molly Dear" and "Cold Penitentiary Blues". He recorded again, under the name Frank Shelton, for Columbia Records at the Johnson City sessions in Johnson City, Tennessee in October 1928, but the recordings were not issued and have not survived.

Shelton was born in Clay County, Kentucky and died in Whitley County, Kentucky.

References

External links
Listen to "Pretty Polly" at the Internet Archive
"Pretty Polly" by B. F. Shelton at folktunes.org

1902 births
1963 deaths
American banjoists
People from Corbin, Kentucky
Musicians from Appalachia
Singers from Kentucky
20th-century American singers